Fernand de Brinon, Marquis de Brinon (26 August 1885 – 15 April 1947) was a French lawyer and journalist who was one of the architects of French collaboration with the Nazis during World War II. He claimed to have had five private talks with Adolf Hitler between 1933 and 1937.

Brinon was a high official of the collaborationist Vichy regime. During the liberation of France in 1944, remnants of the Vichy leadership fled into exile, where Brinon was selected as president of the rump government in exile. After the war was over, he was tried in France for war crimes, found guilty, sentenced to death, and executed.

Early life and marriage 

Born into a wealthy family in the city of Libourne in the Gironde département, Fernand de Brinon studied political science and law at university but chose to work as a journalist in Paris. After the First World War, he advocated a rapprochement with Germany.  He became friends with Joachim von Ribbentrop.

De Brinon married Jeanne Louise Rachel Franck, the Jewish former wife of Claude Ullmann; she converted to Roman Catholicism.

1930s Paris 

The Brinons became leading socialites in 1930s Paris, and close friends of the political right-wing elite and of radical leader Édouard Daladier. In co-ordination with Ribbentrop's personal representative in Paris, Otto Abetz, Brinon headed the France–Germany Committee, which was designed to influence France's political and cultural establishment in a pro-German direction. This was Nazi Germany's main propaganda technique in their attempt to influence French politics before the Second World War. During the Munich crisis, Brinon sent accounts of the discussions of the French Cabinet to the German government, obtained from two ministers.

Occupied Paris 

A leading advocate for collaboration following France's defeat by Germany in the Second World War, in July 1940 Brinon was invited by Pierre Laval, Vice-Premier of the new  Vichy regime, to act as its representative to the German High Command in occupied Paris. Brinon's seat was the confiscated Hôtel de Breteuil in Paris (12 avenue Foch). Brinon benefited from his long acquaintance with the German ambassador Otto Abetz. In September 1940 he also established the Groupe Collaboration to help establish closer cultural ties between Germany and France. In 1942, Philippe Pétain, head of the Vichy regime, gave him the title of Secretary of State.

As the third-ranking member of the Vichy regime and because of his enthusiastic support for the fascist cause, Brinon's importance to the Nazis was such that he was able to obtain a special pass for his Jewish-born wife that exempted her from deportation to a German concentration camp.

Katyn Massacre 

De Brinon was invited by the German supreme general staff to the Eastern Front, as president of the committee of the Legion of French Volunteers against Bolschevism (LVF), to visit the exhumation of the bodies of the Polish victims in the Katyn forest in April 1943.

Vichy government in exile 

In the face of the Allied invasion of France in June 1944, the remnants of the Vichy regime fled to Sigmaringen, Germany, in September 1944, where the Germans set up the French Governmental Commission for the Defense of National Interests as a government in exile.

The Germans wished to project a facade of legality for the commission, and enlisted de Brinon to serve as president, and other Vichy officials, including  Joseph Darnand, Jean Luchaire, Eugène Bridoux, and Marcel Déat as members.

Arrest and trial 

De Brinon was eventually arrested by the advancing Allied troops. He and his wife were both held in Fresnes prison, but she was eventually released. De Brinon was tried in the épuration légale by the French Court of Justice for war crimes, found guilty and sentenced to death on 6 March 1947. He was executed by firing squad on 15 April at the military fort in the Paris suburb of Montrouge.

In 2002, French historian Gilbert Joseph published Fernand de Brinon : L'Aristocrate de la collaboration. In 2004, Bernard Ullmann, Lisette de Brinon's son from her first marriage, broke his 60-year silence and told his family's story in his book, Lisette de Brinon, Ma Mère.

References

Works cited

 
 Mauthner, Martin: Otto Abetz and His Paris Acolytes - French Writers Who Flirted with Fascism, 1930–1945. Sussex Academic Press, 2016,

External links
 

1885 births
1947 deaths
French fascists
French nobility
French politicians convicted of crimes
Socialites from Paris
People from Libourne
People of Vichy France
Executed people from Aquitaine
French male non-fiction writers
Heads of government convicted of war crimes
Nazi collaborators shot at the Fort de Montrouge
20th-century French lawyers
20th-century French journalists
20th-century French male writers